The 2016 Detroit Tigers season was the team's 116th season. The Tigers opened the season on the road against the Miami Marlins on April 5, and their home opener was on April 8 against the New York Yankees. The Tigers finished the season in second place in the American League Central division, with an 86–75 record. They had a chance for a Wild Card berth until the final day of the regular season, but their 1–0 loss to the Atlanta Braves and wins by the Baltimore Orioles and Toronto Blue Jays kept the team out of the playoffs for the second consecutive season.

Roster moves

Coaching staff
On October 19, Jeff Jones announced his retirement, after spending the last five seasons as the Tigers pitching coach, and nine seasons on the Tigers' coaching staff. On October 29, Rich Dubee was hired as his successor.

Signings

On November 30, the Tigers signed pitcher Jordan Zimmermann to a five-year, $110 million contract.
On December 6, the Tigers signed pitcher Mike Pelfrey to a two-year, $16 million contract.
Also on December 6, the Tigers signed catcher Jarrod Saltalamacchia to a one-year contract for the major league minimum salary. (The Miami Marlins were paying the bulk of Saltalamacchia's existing contract through the end of 2016.)
On December 8, the Tigers signed pitcher Mark Lowe to a two-year, $11 million contract.
On December 18, the Tigers signed utility player Mike Avilés to a one-year, $2 million contract.
On January 13, the Tigers avoided arbitration with newly acquired pitcher Justin Wilson, agreeing on a one-year, $1.525 million contract.
On January 14, the Tigers avoided arbitration with infielder Andrew Romine, agreeing on a one-year, $900,000 contract.
On January 15, the Tigers avoided arbitration with shortstop José Iglesias, agreeing on a one-year, $2.1 million contract.
On January 20, the Tigers signed outfielder Justin Upton to a six-year, $132.75 million contract.
On February 8, the Tigers avoided arbitration with outfielder J. D. Martinez, agreeing on a two-year, $18.5 million contract extension.

Releases
On November 9, relief pitcher Guido Knudson was claimed off waivers by the Pittsburgh Pirates.
On November 25, free agent catcher Alex Avila left the Tigers and signed a one-year, $2.5 million contract with the Chicago White Sox.
On December 2, the Tigers announced they would not tender contracts to relief pitchers Al Alburquerque and Neftalí Feliz, making them free agents. On January 6, Feliz signed a one-year, $3.9 million contract with the Pittsburgh Pirates. On January 19, Alburquerque signed a one-year, $1.1 million contract with the Los Angeles Angels of Anaheim.
On December 17, free agent outfielder Rajai Davis left the Tigers and signed a one-year, $5.25 million contract with the Cleveland Indians.
On March 17, free agent pitcher Alfredo Simón left the Tigers and signed a one-year, $2 million contract with the Cincinnati Reds.

Trades

On November 18, the Tigers acquired closer Francisco Rodríguez from the Milwaukee Brewers in exchange for infielder Javier Betancourt and a player to be named later. The second player was revealed in December to be minor league catcher Manny Piña.
On November 20, the Tigers traded relief pitchers Ian Krol and Gabe Speier to the Atlanta Braves in exchange for outfielder Cameron Maybin.
On December 9, the Tigers traded pitchers Chad Green and Luis Cessa to the New York Yankees in exchange for pitcher Justin Wilson.
On December 21, the Tigers traded pitcher Kyle Lobstein to the Pittsburgh Pirates in exchange for cash considerations.
On January 27, the Tigers traded infielder Jefry Marté to the Los Angeles Angels of Anaheim in exchange for infielder Kody Eaves.
On March 29, the Tigers traded catcher Bryan Holaday to the Texas Rangers in exchange for catcher Bobby Wilson and pitcher Myles Jaye.
On May 3, the Tigers traded catcher Bobby Wilson to the Texas Rangers in exchange for pitcher Chad Bell.
On June 7, the Tigers traded pitcher José Valdez to the Los Angeles Angels of Anaheim in exchange for cash considerations.
On August 16, the Tigers traded utility player Mike Avilés and catcher Kade Scivicque to the Atlanta Braves in exchange for shortstop Erick Aybar.

Standings

American League Central

American League Wild Card

Record vs. opponents

Season highlights

Team accomplishments
On June 30, the Tigers erased a 7–2 deficit against the Tampa Bay Rays by scoring eight runs in the top of the ninth inning, winning the game 10–7. This marked the seventh time since 1913 that Detroit won a game after trailing by five or more runs entering the ninth inning. The eight runs were the most the Tigers have scored in the ninth inning since scoring 13 on August 8, 2001, at Texas.

Individual accomplishments

Hitting
On April 5, Justin Verlander became the first Tigers pitcher to record a hit on Opening Day since Mickey Lolich in 1971, and the first American League pitcher to do since Milwaukee's Bill Parsons and Oakland's Ken Holtzman both singled on April 15, 1972.
On April 6, Víctor Martínez became the first player in modern Major League history to hit a pinch-hit home run in his team's first two regular-season games of the season, and the first player to do so since at least 1914.
On April 13, Jarrod Saltalamacchia hit his 100th career home run, with a grand slam off Arquimedes Caminero of the Pittsburgh Pirates.
On April 20, Víctor Martínez recorded his 1,000th career RBI, becoming just the fifth Venezuelan-born player in MLB history to reach the milestone.
On June 12, Miguel Cabrera recorded his 2,400th career hit, becoming the fifth-youngest player in Major League history to reach the milestone, at 33 years, 55 days old.
On June 16, Víctor Martínez hit three home runs in a single game, and became the first Tigers player to hit a home run from each side of the plate in the same game since Carlos Guillén in 2009.
On July 3, Ian Kinsler hit his 200th career home run off Danny Farquhar of the Tampa Bay Rays. Kinsler became the third active Major League player, and the 40th overall, with 200 home runs, 1,000 runs scored, 1,600 hits and 200 stolen bases.
On July 18, Justin Upton hit his 200th career home run off Ricky Nolasco of the Minnesota Twins.
On July 22, Miguel Cabrera recorded his 1,500th career RBI, becoming the 56th player to reach the milestone.
On September 5, Miguel Cabrera hit his 30th home run of the season and his 300th home run as a Detroit Tiger. He joins Al Kaline (399), Norm Cash (373) and Hank Greenberg (306) as the only four players to hit 300+ home runs in a Tiger uniform.
On September 12, Ian Kinsler recorded his seventh lead-off home run of the season, tying the Tigers' franchise record set by Curtis Granderson. Kinsler broke the tie on September 30 with his eighth leadoff homer of the season. This home run also gave Kinsler 28 for the season, tying the franchise record for second basemen set by Lou Whitaker in 1989.
On September 18, Miguel Cabrera recorded his 2,500th career hit. Cabrera became the 100th player in Major League history to reach the milestone, just the eighth player to do so by his age-33 season, and the youngest since Hank Aaron did so in 1967.
Miguel Cabrera won his 7th career Silver Slugger Award.

Pitching
On April 20, Jordan Zimmermann became the first pitcher in Tigers history to begin a season with three consecutive outings of six or more scoreless innings. His  consecutive shutout innings mark the longest streak to begin a Tigers tenure since Doug Bair threw  consecutive scoreless innings after a midseason trade from St. Louis in 1983.
Jordan Zimmermann became the sixth pitcher to finish April with five-plus wins, zero losses and a sub-1.00 ERA. He joins Fernando Valenzuela (1981), Randy Johnson (2000), Cliff Lee (2008), Zack Greinke (2009), and Ubaldo Jiménez (2010). Zimmermann's 0.55 ERA is the third-best mark for April in Tigers history. He allowed just two earned runs in 33 innings pitched. The only two Detroit pitchers with better ERAs in April were Bernie Boland with a 0.30 ERA in 1915 and John Hiller with a 0.36 ERA in 1974. Zimmermann became the first Detroit pitcher to win each of his first five starts to a season since Frank Tanana in 1988. Zimmermann was named the American League Pitcher of the Month for April.
On May 8, Justin Verlander recorded his 1,981st strikeout, surpassing Jack Morris for the second-most strikeouts among Tigers pitchers. Verlander only trails Mickey Lolich who had 2,679 strikeouts as a Tiger from 1963 to 1975.
On May 18, Justin Verlander recorded his 2,000th career strikeout, becoming just the second Tigers pitcher to reach the milestone, following Mickey Lolich.
On May 24, Francisco Rodríguez recorded his 400th career save, becoming just the sixth pitcher in MLB history to reach the milestone.
On June 6, Michael Fulmer became the first pitcher in Tigers history to pitch three consecutive scoreless outings of six innings or more while allowing three or fewer hits.
On June 12, Michael Fulmer became just the second pitcher in Major League history to pitch four consecutive scoreless outings of six innings or more while allowing three or fewer hits, following Jake Arrieta. Fulmer extended his scoreless streak to  innings, the second-longest streak in franchise history by a rookie, trailing only John Hiller's  scoreless innings in 1967.
On June 17, Michael Fulmer's consecutive scoreless innings streak ended at  innings, a new Tigers rookie record. This was the longest consecutive scoreless innings streak by a rookie pitcher in baseball since Orel Hershiser threw 32 scoreless innings in 1984, and was just short of the all-time rookie record of 35 consecutive scoreless innings set by Fernando Valenzuela in 1981.
Justin Verlander was named the American League Pitcher of the Month for July. Verlander was 4–0 with a 1.69 ERA and a 0.89 WHIP in six July starts, holding opposing hitters to a .171 average and striking out 48 batters in  innings.
On September 5, Francisco Rodríguez recorded his 425th career save, passing John Franco for fourth place on the all-time saves list.
Justin Verlander fanned 254 batters in 2016, leading the American League in strikeouts for the fourth time in his career.
Michael Fulmer was awarded the AL Rookie of the Year Award.

Defensive
On May 31, James McCann committed a throwing error, ending his Major League record of 139 games to start a career at catcher without committing an error.
On November 8, Ian Kinsler was named the AL Gold Glove Award winner at second base. It was Kinsler's first career Gold Glove Award, and the first Gold Glove won by a Tiger infielder since fellow second baseman Plácido Polanco earned the honor in 2009.

Other

Game log

|- bgcolor="#bbffbb"
| 1 || April 5 || @ Marlins || 8–7 (11) || VerHagen (1–0) || Breslow (0–1) || Greene (1) || 36,911 || 1–0 || W1
|- bgcolor="#bbffbb"
| 2 || April 6 || @ Marlins ||  7–3 || Sánchez (1–0) || Fernández (0–1) || Rodríguez (1) || 17,883 || 2–0 || W2
|- bgcolor="#bbffbb"
| 3 || April 8 || Yankees ||  4–0 || Zimmermann (1–0) || Severino (0–1) || — || 45,049 || 3–0 || W3
|- bgcolor="ffbbbb"
| 4 || April 9 || Yankees ||  4–8 || Sabathia (1–0) || Pelfrey (0–1) || — || 32,419 || 3–1 || L1
|- bgcolor="bbbbbb"
| — || April 10 || Yankees || colspan="9" | Postponed (inclement weather). Rescheduled to June 2.
|- bgcolor="ffbbbb"
| 5 || April 11 || Pirates ||  4–7 || Niese (1–0) || Verlander (0–1) || Melancon (3) || 26,271 || 3–2 || L2
|- bgcolor="#bbffbb"
| 6 || April 12 || Pirates || 8–2 || Sánchez (2–0) || Nicasio (1–1) || — || 26,489 || 4–2 || W1
|- bgcolor="#bbffbb"
| 7 || April 13 || @ Pirates ||  7–3 || Greene (1–0) || Caminero (0–2) || — || 21,175 || 5–2 || W2
|- bgcolor="#bbffbb"
| 8 || April 14 || @ Pirates ||  7–4 || Zimmermann (2–0) || Cole (0–2) || Rodríguez (2) || 18,751 || 6–2 || W3
|- bgcolor="ffbbbb"
| 9 || April 15 || @ Astros ||  0–1 || Keuchel (2–1) || Pelfrey (0–2) || Gregerson (3) || 30,092 || 6–3 || L1
|- bgcolor="#bbffbb"
| 10 || April 16 || @ Astros ||  5–3 || Verlander (1–1) || McHugh (1–2) || Rodríguez (3) || 30,013 || 7–3 || W1
|- bgcolor="ffbbbb"
| 11 || April 17 || @ Astros ||  4–5 || Fiers (1–1) || Sánchez (2–1) || Gregerson (4) || 30,657 || 7–4 || L1
|- bgcolor="ffbbbb"
| 12 || April 19 || @ Royals ||  6–8 || Ventura (1–0) || Greene (1–1) || Davis (6) || 26,889 || 7–5 || L2
|- bgcolor="#bbffbb"
| 13 || April 20 || @ Royals ||  3–2 || Zimmermann (3–0) || Kennedy (2–1) || Rodríguez (4) || 28,928 || 8–5 || |W1
|- bgcolor="ffbbbb"
| 14 || April 21 || @ Royals ||  0–4 || Vólquez (3–0) || Pelfrey (0–3) || — || 30,763 || 8–6 || L1
|- bgcolor="ffbbbb"
| 15 || April 22 || Indians || 1–2 || Tomlin (2–0) || Verlander (1–2) || Allen (5) || 25,086 || 8–7 || L2
|- bgcolor="ffbbbb"
| 16 || April 23 || Indians || 1–10 || Kluber (1–3) || Sánchez (2–2) || — || 31,163 || 8–8 || L3
|- bgcolor="ffbbbb"
| 17 || April 24 || Indians || 3–6 || Bauer (1–0) || Greene (1–2) || Allen (6) || 31,947 || 8–9 || L4
|- bgcolor="#bbffbb"
| 18 || April 25 || Athletics || 7–3 || Zimmermann (4–0) || Graveman (1–2) || — || 21,671 || 9–9 || W1
|- bgcolor="ffbbbb"
| 19 || April 26 || Athletics || 1–5 || Hill (3–2) || Pelfrey (0–4) || — || 22,256 || 9–10 || L1
|- bgcolor="#bbffbb"
| 20 || April 27 || Athletics || 9–4 || Verlander (2–2) || Gray (3–2 || — || 22,636 || 10–10 || W1
|- bgcolor="#bbffbb"
| 21 || April 28 || Athletics || 7–3 || Sánchez (3–2) || Bassitt (0–2) || Rodríguez (5) || 26,200 || 11–10 || W2
|- bgcolor="#bbffbb"
| 22 || April 29 || @ Twins || 9–2 || Fulmer (1–0) || Hughes (1–4) || — || 23,049 || 12–10 || W3
|- bgcolor="#bbffbb"
| 23 || April 30 || @ Twins || 4–1 || Zimmermann (5–0) || Duffey (0–1) || Rodríguez (6) || 31,109 || 13–10 || W4
|-

|- bgcolor="#bbffbb"
| 24 || May 1 || @ Twins ||  6–5 || Lowe (1–0) || Pressly (1–2) || Rodríguez (7) || 24,749 || 14–10 || W5
|- bgcolor="ffbbbb"
| 25 || May 3 || @ Indians ||  3–7 || Tomlin (4–0) || Verlander (2–3) || — || 11,022 || 14–11 || L1
|- bgcolor="ffbbbb"
| 26 || May 4 || @ Indians ||  0–4 || Kluber (2–3) || Sánchez (3–3) || — || 8,766 || 14–12 || L2
|- bgcolor="ffbbbb"
| 27 || May 5 || @ Indians ||  4–9 || Bauer (2–0) || Fulmer (1–1) || — || 10,350 || 14–13 || L3
|- bgcolor="ffbbbb"
| 28 || May 6 || Rangers ||  1–5 || Hamels (4–0) || Zimmermann (5–1) || — || 28,522 || 14–14 || L4
|- bgcolor="ffbbbb"
| 29 || May 7 || Rangers || 5–10 || Ranaudo (1–0) || Ryan (0–1) || Tolleson (10) || 35,551 || 14–15 || L5
|- bgcolor="ffbbbb"
| 30 || May 8 || Rangers ||  3–8 || Wilhelmsen (2–2) || Lowe (1–1) || — || 35,406 || 14–16 || L6
|- bgcolor="ffbbbb"
| 31 || May 9 || @ Nationals || 4–5 || Kelley (1–0) || Lowe (1–2) || — || 27,153 || 14–17 || L7
|- bgcolor="#bbffbb"
| 32 || May 10 || @ Nationals || 5–4 || Fulmer (2–1) || Ross (3–2) || Rodríguez (8) || 24,476 || 15–17 || W1
|- bgcolor="ffbbbb"
| 33 || May 11 || @ Nationals || 2–3 || Scherzer (4–2) || Zimmermann (5–2) || — || 35,695 || 15–18 || L1
|- bgcolor="ffbbbb"
| 34 || May 12 || @ Orioles || 5–7 || Worley (2–0) || J. Wilson (0–1) || Britton (9) || 14,918 || 15–19 || L2
|- bgcolor="ffbbbb"
| 35 || May 13 || @ Orioles || 0–1 || Tillman (5–1) || Verlander (2–4) || Britton (10) || 30,488 || 15–20 || L3
|- bgcolor="ffbbbb"
| 36 || May 14 || @ Orioles || 3–9 || Wright (2–3) ||  Sánchez (3–4) || Brach (1) || 32,174 || 15–21 || L4
|- bgcolor="#bbffbb"
| 37 || May 15 || @ Orioles || 6–5 || Saupold (1–0) || O'Day (2–1) || Rodríguez (9) || 37,890 || 16–21 || W1
|- bgcolor="#bbffbb"
| 38 || May 16 || Twins || 10–8 || Zimmermann (6–2) || Dean (0–1) || Rodríguez (10) || 25,925 || 17–21 || W2
|- bgcolor="#bbffbb"
| 39 || May 17 || Twins || 7–2 || Ryan (1–1) || Tonkin (1–2) || — || 27,652 || 18–21 || W3
|- bgcolor="#bbffbb"
| 40 || May 18 || Twins || 6–3 || Verlander (3–4) || Nolasco (1–2) || Rodríguez (11) || 29,035 || 19–21 || W4
|- bgcolor="ffbbbb"
| 41 || May 20 || Rays || 5–7 || Andriese (3–0) || Sánchez (3–5) || Colomé (11) || 30,304 || 19–22 || L1
|- bgcolor="#bbffbb"
| 42 || May 21 || Rays || 5–4 || Fulmer (3–1) || Smyly (2–5) || Rodríguez (12) || 32,316 || 20–22 || W1
|- bgcolor="#bbffbb"
| 43 || May 22 || Rays || 9–4 || Zimmermann (7–2) || Archer (3–5) || — || 34,758 || 21–22 || W2
|- bgcolor="#bbffbb"
| 44 || May 23 || Phillies || 5–4 || J. Wilson (1–1) || Murray (0–1) || Rodríguez (13) || 26,400 || 22–22 || W3
|- bgcolor="#bbffbb"
| 45 || May 24 || Phillies || 3–1 || Verlander (4–4) || Hellickson (4–3) || Rodríguez (14) || 26,531 || 23–22 || W4
|- bgcolor="ffbbbb"
| 46 || May 25 || Phillies || 5–8 || Nola (4–3) || Sánchez (3–6) || Gómez (17) || 31,187 || 23–23 || L1
|- bgcolor="#bbffbb"
| 47 || May 27 || @ Athletics || 4–1 || Fulmer (4–1) || Manaea (1–3) || — || 22,498 || 24–23 || W1
|- bgcolor="ffbbbb"
| 48 || May 28 || @ Athletics || 3–12 || Hahn (2–2) || Saupold (1–1) || — || 24,154 || 24–24 || L1
|- bgcolor="ffbbbb"
| 49 || May 29 || @ Athletics || 2–4 || Hill (8–3) || Pelfrey (0–5) || Doolittle (3) ||L2 20,522 || 24–25 || L2
|- bgcolor="ffbbbb"
| 50 || May 30 || @ Angels || 1–5 || Chacín (1–1) || Verlander (4–5) || — || 38,541 || 24–26 || L3
|- bgcolor="ffbbbb"
| 51 || May 31 || @ Angels || 9–11 || Street (2–0) || Lowe (1–3) || — || 35,125 || 24–27 || L4
|-

|- bgcolor="#bbffbb"
| 52 || June 1 || @ Angels || 3–0 || Fulmer (5–1) || Shoemaker (3–6) || Rodríguez (15) || 35,053 || 25–27 || W1
|- bgcolor="ffbbbb"
| 53 || June 2 || Yankees || 4–5 || Betances (2–2) || Boyd (0–1) || Chapman (8) || 28,213 || 25–28 || L1
|- bgcolor="#bbffbb"
| 54 || June 3 || White Sox || 10–3 || Zimmermann (8–2) || Rodon (2–5) || — || 31,184 || 26–28 || W1
|- bgcolor="#bbffbb"
| 55 || June 4 || White Sox || 7–4 || Pelfrey (1–5) || Sale (9–2) || Rodríguez (16) || 32,916 || 27–28 || W2
|- bgcolor|- bgcolor="#bbffbb"
| 56 || June 5 || White Sox || 5–2 || Verlander (5–5) || Quintana (5–6) || Rodríguez (17) || 29,086 || 28–28 || W3
|- bgcolor|- bgcolor="#bbffbb"
| 57 || June 6 || Blue Jays || 11–0 || Fulmer (6–1) || Happ (6–3) || — || 29,771 || 29–28 || W4
|- bgcolor|- bgcolor="#bbffbb"
| 58 || June 7 || Blue Jays || 3–2 (10) || J. Wilson (2–1) || Biagini (3–2) || — || 30,745 || 30–28 || W5
|- bgcolor="ffbbbb"
| 59 || June 8 || Blue Jays || 2–7 || Dickey (4–6) || Zimmermann (8–3) || — || 36,036 || 30–29 || L1
|- bgcolor="ffbbbb"
| 60 || June 10 || @ Yankees || 0–4 || Sabathia (4–4) || Pelfrey (1–6) || — || 40,011 || 30–30 || L2
|- bgcolor="#bbffbb"
| 61 || June 11 || @ Yankees || 6–1 || Verlander (6–5) || Tanaka (3–2) || Rodríguez (18) || 38,050 || 31–30 || W1
|- bgcolor="#bbffbb"
| 62 || June 12 || @ Yankees || 4–1 || Fulmer (7–1) || Pineda (3–7) || Rodríguez (19) || 47,474 || 32–30 || W2
|- bgcolor="ffbbbb"
| 63 || June 13 || @ White Sox || 9–10 (12) || Duke (1–0) || Sánchez (3–7) || — || 16,314 || 32–31 || L1
|- bgcolor="#bbffbb"
| 64 || June 14 || @ White Sox || 11–8 || Zimmermann (9–3) || González (1–2) || — || 17,403 || 33–31 || W1
|- bgcolor="ffbbbb"
| 65 || June 15 || @ White Sox || 3–5 || Sale (11–2) || Pelfrey (1–7) || Robertson (16) || 20,292 || 33–32 || L1
|- bgcolor="#bbffbb"
| 66 || June 16 || @ Royals || 10–4 || Verlander (7–5) || Hochevar (1–1) || — || 33,568 || 34–32 || W1
|- bgcolor="ffbbbb"
| 67 || June 17 || @ Royals || 3–10 || Ventura (6–4) || Fulmer (7–2) || — || 37,746 || 34–33 || L1
|- bgcolor="ffbbbb"
| 68 || June 18 || @ Royals || 5–16 || Vólquez (7–6) || Boyd (0–2) || — || 38,480 || 34–34 || L2
|- bgcolor="ffbbbb"
| 69 || June 19 || @ Royals || 1–2 (13) || Wang (4–0) || Ryan (1–2) || — || 34,659 || 34–35 || L3
|- bgcolor="#bbffbb"
| 70 || June 20 || Mariners || 8–7 (12) || Sánchez (4–7) || Nuño (0–1) || — || 27,670 || 35–35 || W1
|- bgcolor="#bbffbb"
| 71 || June 21 || Mariners || 4–2 || Rondón (1–0) || Paxton (1–3) || Rodríguez (20) || 30,150 || 36–35 || W2
|- bgcolor="#bbffbb"
| 72 || June 22 || Mariners || 5–1 || Ryan (2–2) || Iwakuma (6–6) || — || 31,497 || 37–35 || W3
|- bgcolor="#bbffbb"
| 73 || June 23 || Mariners || 5–4 (10) || Ryan (3–2) || Cishek (2–4) || — || 35,767 || 38–35 || W4
|- bgcolor="ffbbbb"
| 74 || June 24 || Indians || 5–7 || Salazar (9–3) || Zimmermann (9–4) || — || 37,886 || 38–36 || L1
|- bgcolor="ffbbbb"
| 75 || June 25 || Indians || 0–6 || Carrasco (3–2) || Sánchez (4–8) || — || 39,028 || 38–37 || L2
|- bgcolor="ffbbbb"
| 76 || June 26 || Indians || 3–9 || Tomlin (9–1) || Verlander (7–6) || — || 36,502 || 38–38 || L3
|- bgcolor="#bbffbb"
| 77 || June 28 || Marlins || 7–5 || Pelfrey (2–7) || Conley (4–5) || Rodríguez (21) || 30,808 || 39–38 || W1
|- bgcolor="#bbffbb"
| 78 || June 29 || Marlins || 10–3 || Norris (1–0) || Koehler (6–7) || — || 31,760 || 40–38 || W2
|- bgcolor="#bbffbb"
| 79 || June 30 || @ Rays || 10–7 || Sánchez (5–8) || Ramírez (7–7) || Rodríguez (22) || 10,729 || 41–38 ||W3
|-

|- bgcolor="#bbffbb"
| 80 || July 1 || @ Rays || 10–2 || Fulmer (8–2) || Smyly (2–9) || — || 13,537 || 42–38 || W4
|- bgcolor="#bbffbb"
| 81 || July 2 || @ Rays || 3–2 || Verlander (8–6)|| Snell (1–3) || Rodríguez (23) || 17,861 || 43–38 || W5
|- bgcolor="#bbffbb"
| 82 || July 3 || @ Rays || 5–1 || Rondón (2–0) || Andriese (6–2) || — || 13,126 || 44–38 || W6
|- bgcolor="ffbbbb"
| 83 || July 4 || @ Indians || 3–5 || Manship (1–1) || Rondón (2–1) || Allen (18) || 34,163 || 44–39 || L1
|- bgcolor="ffbbbb"
| 84 || July 5 || @ Indians || 1–12 || Carrasco (5–2) || Sánchez (5–9) || — || 19,448 || 44–40 || L2
|- bgcolor="#bbffbb"
| 85 || July 6 || @ Indians || 12–2 || Fulmer (9–2) || Tomlin (9–2) || — || 24,098 || 45–40 || W1
|- bgcolor="ffbbbb"
| 86 || July 7 || @ Blue Jays || 4–5 || Grilli (2–0) || J. Wilson (2–2) || Osuna (18) || 46,283 || 45–41 || L1
|- bgcolor="ffbbbb"
| 87 || July 8 || @ Blue Jays || 0–6 || Happ (12–3) || Pelfrey (2–8) || — || 43,228 || 45–42 || L2
|- bgcolor="#bbffbb"
| 88 || July 9 || @ Blue Jays || 3–2 || Rondón (3–1) || Grilli (2–1) || Rodríguez (24) || 47,684 || 46–42 || W1
|- bgcolor="ffbbbb"
| 89 || July 10 || @ Blue Jays || 1–6 || Dickey (7–9) || Sánchez (5–10) || — || 47,747 || 46–43 || L1
|- style="text-align:center; background:#bbcaff;"
| colspan="10" | 2016 Major League Baseball All-Star Game
|- bgcolor="#bbffbb"
| 90 || July 15 || Royals || 4–2 || Verlander (9–6) || Hochevar (1–2) || Rodríguez (25) || 37,447 || 47–43 || W1
|- bgcolor="ffbbbb"
| 91 || July 16 || Royals || 4–8 || Duffy (5–1) || Pelfrey (2–9) || — || 39,594 || 47–44 || L1
|- bgcolor="#bbffbb"
| 92 || July 17 || Royals || 4–2 || Rodríguez (1–0) || Soria (3–4) || — || 37,363 || 48–44 || W1
|- bgcolor="#bbffbb"
| 93 || July 18 || Twins || 1–0 || Boyd (1–2) || Nolasco (4–8) || Rodríguez (26) || 29,290 || 49–44 || W2
|- bgcolor="ffbbbb"
| 94 || July 19 || Twins || 2–6 || Milone (3–2) || Sánchez (5–11) || — || 32,030 || 49–45 || L1
|- bgcolor="ffbbbb"
| 95 || July 20 || Twins || 1–4 || Pressly (3–5) || Rodríguez (1–1) || Kintzler (6) || 35,020 || 49–46 || L2
|- bgcolor="#bbffbb"
| 96 || July 21 || @ White Sox || 2–1 (7) || Pelfrey (3–9) || Shields (2–5) || Greene (2) || 24,938 || 50–46 || W1
|- bgcolor="#bbffbb"
| 97 || July 22 || @ White Sox || 7–5 || Ryan (4–2) || Fulmer (0–1) || Rodríguez (27) || 22,611 || 51–46 || W2
|- bgcolor="ffbbbb"
| 98 || July 24 || @ White Sox || 3–4 || Robertson (1–2) || J. Wilson (2–3) || — || 32,527 || 51–47 || L1
|- bgcolor="ffbbbb"
| 99 || July 24 || @ White Sox || 4–5 || Robertson (2–2) || Rondón (3–2) || — || 30,281 || 51–48 || L2
|- bgcolor="#bbffbb"
| 100 || July 25 || @ Red Sox || 4–2 || Verlander (10–6) || Pomeranz (0–1) || Rodríguez (28) || 37,479 || 52–48 || W1
|- bgcolor="#bbffbb"
| 101 || July 26 || @ Red Sox || 9–8 || A. Wilson (1–0) || Ross (1–2) || Rodríguez (29) || 38,378 || 53–48 || W2
|- bgcolor="#bbffbb"
| 102 || July 27 || @ Red Sox || 4–3 || Rondón (4–2) || Ziegler (0–1) || J. Wilson (1) || 37,842 || 54–48 || W3
|- bgcolor="#bbffbb"
| 103 || July 29 || Astros || 14–6 || Boyd (2–2) || McHugh (7–7) || — || 31,771 || 55–48 || W4
|- bgcolor="#bbffbb"
| 104 || July 30 || Astros || 3–2 || Verlander (11–6) || Harris (1–2) || — || 34,673 || 56–48 || W5
|- bgcolor="#bbffbb"
| 105 || July 31 || Astros || 11–0 || Pelfrey (4–9) || Keuchel (6–11) || — || 31,045 || 57–48 || W6
|-

|- bgcolor="#bbffbb"
| 106 || August 2 || White Sox || 11–5 || Sánchez (6–11) || Shields (3–6) || — || 30,316 || 58–48 || W7
|- bgcolor="#bbffbb"
| 107 || August 3 || White Sox || 2–1 || Greene (2–2) || Sale (14–5) || Rodríguez (30) || 32,526 || 59–48 || W8
|- bgcolor="ffbbbb"
| 108 || August 4 || White Sox || 3–6 || Quintana (9–8) || Zimmermann (9–5) || Robertson (26) || 33,023 || 59–49 || L1
|- bgcolor="#bbffbb"
| 109 || August 5 || Mets || 4–3 || Verlander (12–6) || Syndergaard (9–6) || Rodríguez (31) || 33,032 || 60–49 || W1
|- bgcolor="#bbffbb"
| 110 || August 6 || Mets || 6–5 || Boyd (3–2) || Verrett (3–7) || Rodríguez (32) || 41,053 || 61–49 || W2
|- bgcolor="ffbbbb"
| 111 || August 7 || Mets || 1–3 || Reed (3–2) || Rodríguez (1–2) || Familia (39) || 32,074 || 61–50 || L1
|- bgcolor="ffbbbb"
| 112 || August 8 || @ Mariners || 0–3 || Iwakuma (13–7) || Fulmer (9–3) || Diaz (5) || 20,002 || 61–51 || L2
|- bgcolor="ffbbbb"
| 113 || August 9 || @ Mariners || 5–6 (15) || Miranda (1–0) || Rodríguez (1–3) || — || 19,713 || 61–52 || L3
|- bgcolor="ffbbbb"
| 114 || August 10 || @ Mariners || 1–3 || Caminero (1–0) || J. Wilson (2–4) || Vincent (2) || 28,742 || 61–53 || L4
|- bgcolor="ffbbbb"
| 115 || August 12 || @ Rangers || 5–8 || Darvish (3–3) || Sánchez (6–12) || Dyson (26) || 31,190 || 61–54 || L5
|- bgcolor="#bbffbb"
| 116 || August 13 || @ Rangers || 2–0 || Boyd (4–2) || Hamels (12–4) || Rodríguez (33) || 37,792 || 62–54 || W1
|- bgcolor="#bbffbb"
| 117 || August 14 || @ Rangers || 7–0 || Fulmer (10–3) || Griffin (5–2) || — || 35,458 || 63–54 || W2
|- bgcolor="ffbbbb"
| 118 || August 15 || Royals || 1–3 || Kennedy (7–9) || Norris (1–1) || Herrera (5) || 29,803 || 63–55 || L1
|- bgcolor="ffbbbb"
| 119 || August 16 || Royals || 1–6 || Duffy (10–1) || Verlander (12–7) || — || 28,663 || 63–56 || L2
|- bgcolor="ffbbbb"
| 120 || August 17 || Royals || 1–4 || Strahm (1–0) || Greene (2–3) || Herrera (6) || 28,790 || 63–57 || L3
|- bgcolor="#bbffbb"
| 121 || August 18 || Red Sox || 4–3 || J. Wilson (3–4) || Tazawa (2–2) || Rodríguez (34) || 34,649 || 64–57 || W1
|- bgcolor="ffbbbb"
| 122 || August 19 || Red Sox || 2–10 || Porcello (17–3) || Fulmer (10–4) || — || 36,108 || 64–58 || L1
|- bgcolor="ffbbbb"
| 123 || August 20 || Red Sox || 2–3 || Pomeranz (2–2) || Norris (1–2) || Kimbrel (22) || 37,886 || 64–59 || L2
|- bgcolor="#bbffbb"
| 124 || August 21 || Red Sox || 10–5 ||  Verlander (13–7) || Owens (0–1) || — || 31,032 || 65–59 || W1
|- bgcolor="#bbffbb"
| 125 || August 23 || @ Twins || 8–3 || Sánchez (7–12) || Gibson (5–8) || — || 24,379 || 66–59 || W2
|- bgcolor="#bbffbb"
| 126 || August 24 || @ Twins || 9–4 || Boyd (5–2) || Duffey (8–10) || — || 24,309 || 67–59 || W3
|- bgcolor="#bbffbb"
| 127 || August 25 || @ Twins || 8–5 || Norris (2–2) || Berríos (2–4) || Rodríguez (35) || 26,437 || 68–59 || W4
|- bgcolor="#bbffbb"
| 128 || August 26 || Angels || 4–2 || Verlander (14–7) || Nolasco (4–12) || Rodríguez (36) || 31,357 || 69–59 || W5
|- bgcolor="ffbbbb"
| 129 || August 27 || Angels || 2–3 || Chacín (4–6) || Fulmer (10–5) || Salas (5) || 33,115 || 69–60 || L1
|- bgcolor="ffbbbb"
| 130 || August 28 || Angels || 0–5 || Skaggs (2–3) || Sánchez (7–13) || — || 28,220 || 69–61 || L2
|- bgcolor="#bbffbb"
| 131 || August 29 || White Sox || 4–3 || J. Wilson (4–4) || Jones (5–3) || Rodríguez (37) || 27,201 || 70–61 || W1
|- bgcolor="#bbffbb"
| 132 || August 30 || White Sox || 8–4 || Rondón (5–2) || Albers (2–6) || — || 27,121 || 71–61 || W2
|- bgcolor="#bbffbb"
| 133 || August 31 || White Sox || 4–3 || Rodríguez (2–3) || Robertson (4–3) || — || 32,465 || 72–61 || W3
|-

|- bgcolor="#bbffbb"
| 134 || September 2 || @ Royals || 7–6 || Rodríguez (3–3) || Davis (1–1) || — || 25,008 || 73–61 || W4
|- bgcolor="ffbbbb"
| 135 || September 3 || @ Royals || 2–5 || Ventura (10–9) || Fulmer (10–6)|| Davis (22) || 39,757 || 73–62 || L1
|- bgcolor="#bbffbb"
| 136 || September 4 || @ Royals || 6–5 || Greene (3–3) || Soria (4–7) || Rodríguez (38) || 34,616 || 74–62 || W1
|- bgcolor="#bbffbb"
| 137 || September 5 || @ White Sox || 5–3 (11) || A. Wilson (2–0) || Beck (1–1) || Rodríguez (39) || 18,653 || 75–62 || W2
|- bgcolor="ffbbbb"
| 138 || September 6 || @ White Sox || 0–2 || González (3–6) || Boyd (5–3) || Robertson (34) || 15,155 || 75–63 || L1
|- bgcolor="ffbbbb"
| 139 || September 7 || @ White Sox || 4–7 || Beck (2–1) || Greene (3–4) || Robertson (35) || 13,078 || 75–64 || L2
|- bgcolor="#bbffbb"
| 140 || September 9 || Orioles || 4–3 || A. Wilson (3–0) || Brach (8–3) || Rodríguez (40) || 32,140 || 76–64 || W1
|- bgcolor="ffbbbb"
| 141 || September 10 || Orioles || 3–11 || Jiménez (7–11) || Zimmermann (9–6) || — || 36,634 || 76–65 || L1
|- bgcolor="ffbbbb"
| 142 || September 11 || Orioles || 1–3 || Tillman (16–5) || Verlander (14–8) || Britton (41) || 33,069 || 76–66 || L2
|- bgcolor="#bbffbb"
| 143 || September 12 || Twins || 4–2 || Greene (4–4) || Wimmers (1–2) || Rodríguez (41) || 28,093 || 77–66 || W1
|- bgcolor="ffbbbb"
| 144 || September 13 || Twins || 1–8 || Gibson (6–9) || Boyd (5–4) || — || 26,393 || 77–67 || L1
|- bgcolor="#bbffbb"
| 145 || September 14 || Twins || 9–6 || Greene (5–4) || Pressly (6–7) || Rodríguez (42) || 27,953 || 78–67 || W1
|- bgcolor="ffbbbb"
| 146 || September 15 || Twins || 1–5 || Santiago (12–8) || Pelfrey (4–10) || — || 26,932 || 78–68 || L1
|- bgcolor="ffbbbb"
| 147 || September 16 || @ Indians || 4–11 || Kluber (17–9) || Fulmer (10–7) || — || 29,137 || 78–69 || L2
|- bgcolor="ffbbbb"
| 148 || September 17 || @ Indians || 0–1 (10) || Miller (8–1) || J. Wilson (4–5) || — || 26,654 || 78–70 || L3
|- bgcolor="#bbffbb"
| 149 || September 18 || @ Indians || 9–5 || Norris (3–2) || Bauer (11–8) || Rodríguez (43) || 21,382 || 79–70 || W1
|- bgcolor="#bbffbb"
| 150 || September 20 || @ Twins || 8–1 || Boyd (6–4) || Santiago (12–9) || — || 23,395 || 80–70 || W2
|- bgcolor="bbbbbb"
| — || September 21 || @ Twins || colspan="9" | Postponed (rain). Rescheduled to September 22.
|- bgcolor="#bbffbb"
| 151 || September 22 || @ Twins || 9–2 || A. Wilson (4–0) || Wimmers (1–3) || — || 18,374 || 81–70 || W3
|- bgcolor="#bbffbb"
| 152 || September 22 || @ Twins || 4–2 || Verlander (15–8) || Santana (7–11) || Rodríguez (44) || 21,599 || 82–70 || W4
|- bgcolor="#bbffbb"
| 153 || September 23 || Royals || 8–3 || Fulmer (11–7) || Duffy (12–3) || — || 29,480 || 83–70 || W5
|- bgcolor="ffbbbb"
| 154 || September 24 || Royals || 4–7 || Davis (2–1) || Rodríguez (3–4) || Herrera (12) || 31,721 || 83–71 || L1
|- bgcolor="ffbbbb"
| 155 || September 25 || Royals || 9–12 || Gee (8–9) || Boyd (6–5) || Davis (26) || 33,375 || 83–72 || L2
|- bgcolor="ffbbbb"
| 156 || September 26 || Indians || 4–7 || Miller (10–1) || Farmer (0–1) || Allen (30) || 24,984 || 83–73 || L3
|- bgcolor="#bbffbb"
| 157 || September 27 || Indians || 12–0 || Verlander (16–8) || Clevinger (2–3) || — || 25,696 || 84–73 || W1
|- bgcolor="#bbffbb"
| 158 || September 28 || Indians || 6–3 (5) || Hardy (1–0) || Colón (1–3) || — || 26,934 || 85–73 || W2
|- bgcolor="bbbbbb"
| — || September 29 || Indians || colspan="9" | Cancelled (rain). Due to the Tigers being eliminated from playoff contention.
|- bgcolor="#bbffbb"
| 159 || September 30 || @ Braves || 6–2 || Norris (4–2) || Wisler (7–13) || — || 41,500 || 86–73 || W3
|-

|- bgcolor="ffbbbb"
| 160 || October 1 || @ Braves || 3–5 || Blair (2–7) || Zimmermann (9–7) || Johnson (19) || 40,124 || 86–74 || L1
|- bgcolor="ffbbbb"
| 161 || October 2 || @ Braves || 0–1 || Teherán (7–10) || Verlander (16–9) || Johnson (20) || 51,220 || 86–75 || L2
|-

Roster

Player stats

Batting

Note: G = Games played; AB = At bats; R = Runs scored; H = Hits; 2B = Doubles; 3B = Triples; HR = Home runs; RBI = Runs batted in; AVG = Batting average; SB = Stolen bases

+Totals with Tigers only.

Pitching

Note: W = Wins; L = Losses; ERA = Earned run average; G = Games pitched; GS = Games started; SV = Saves; IP = Innings pitched; R = Runs allowed; ER = Earned runs allowed; BB = Walks allowed; K = Strikeouts

Starters

Bullpen
Note: W = Wins; L = Losses; ERA = Earned run average; G = Games pitched; GS = Games started; SV = Saves; IP = Innings pitched; R = Runs allowed; ER = Earned runs allowed; BB = Walks allowed; K = Strikeouts

Farm system

References

External links

Detroit Tigers official site
2016 Detroit Tigers at Baseball Reference

Detroit Tigers seasons
Detroit Tigers
Detroit Tigers
2016 in Detroit